Cynthia Lemieux-Guillemette (born 31 March 1990) is a Canadian artistic gymnast. She won a bronze medal in team gymnastics at the 2010 Commonwealth Games.

References

Canadian female artistic gymnasts
1990 births
Living people
Commonwealth Games medallists in gymnastics
Commonwealth Games bronze medallists for Canada
Gymnasts at the 2010 Commonwealth Games
Medallists at the 2010 Commonwealth Games